Savoy Independent School District is a public school district based in Savoy, Texas (USA).

In 2010, the school had approximately 320 students.
The high school has been district UIL champions 2005, 2006, 2007, 2008, 2009, 2010, 2011, 2012, 2013, 2014, 2015, and 2016. UIL State champions in programming team and individual in 2006.

Academic achievement
In 2010, the school district was rated "Exemplary" by the Texas Education Agency.

Special programs

Athletics
Savoy High School plays six-man football.

See also

List of school districts in Texas

References

External links

School districts in Fannin County, Texas